Italia 1990 is a budget football video game developed by Codemasters in 1990.

The game
It was released for Amiga and Atari ST at the £4.99 price point which was a quarter of the price of similar games. The low price however was the best part of the game according to reviewer Andy Smith of Amiga Format who gave a score of 27%: "The game looks all right but plays awfully badly. The sluggishness you can live with and you can even put up with the weird scroll, which sometimes lags far behind the action - but what really screws the game up is the inability to alter the direction of the player once you've pressed the fire button for a shot".

See also
 World Cup Soccer: Italia '90 (the officially licensed game)
 Italy '90 Soccer
 Italy 1990 (video game)

References

External links
 Game  at GameFaqs

1990 video games
Association football video games
Amiga games
Atari ST games
1990 FIFA World Cup
FIFA World Cup video games
Video games scored by Allister Brimble
Video games developed in the United Kingdom